Ann Lake Township is a township in Kanabec County, Minnesota, United States. The population was 377 at the 2000 census.

Ann was the name of a local Ojibwe Indian woman.

Geography

Demographics

Census
As of the census of 2000, there were 377 people, 147 households, and 107 families residing in the township.  The population density was 11.9 people per square mile (4.6/km2).  There were 187 housing units at an average density of 5.9/sq mi (2.3/km2).  The racial makeup of the township was 97.35% White, 0.27% African American, 0.27% Native American, 0.80% Asian, and 1.33% from two or more races. Hispanic or Latino people of any race were 0.27% of the population.

Households
There were 147 households, out of which 29.9% had children under the age of 18 living with them, 55.1% were married couples living together, 9.5% had a female householder with no husband present, and 27.2% were non-families. 23.8% of all households were made up of individuals, and 11.6% had someone living alone who was 65 years of age or older.  The average household size was 2.56 and the average family size was 2.90.

Population by Age
In the township the population was spread out, with 26.5% under the age of 18, 6.1% from 18 to 24, 27.3% from 25 to 44, 27.1% from 45 to 64, and 13.0% who were 65 years of age or older.  The median age was 38 years. For every 100 females, there were 123.1 males.  For every 100 females age 18 and over, there were 118.1 males.

Income
The median income for a household in the township was $45,313, and the median income for a family was $51,607. Males had a median income of $34,583 versus $24,375 for females. The per capita income for the township was $18,318.  About 3.4% of families and 8.4% of the population were below the poverty line, including 11.2% of those under age 18 and 8.0% of those age 65 or over.

References

Townships in Kanabec County, Minnesota
Townships in Minnesota